IOP Publishing (previously Institute of Physics Publishing) is the publishing company of the Institute of Physics. It provides publications through which scientific research is distributed worldwide, including journals, community websites, magazines, conference proceedings and books. The Institute of Physics is a scientific charity devoted to increasing the practice, understanding and application of physics. Any financial surplus earned by IOP Publishing goes to support physics through the activities of the Institute.

The main IOP Publishing headquarters is located in Bristol, England, and the North American headquarters is in Philadelphia, United States. It also has regional offices in, Mexico City, Beijing, Tokyo, Moscow, St. Petersburg, and Sydney. It employs over 400 staff.

It was the first physics publisher to publish a journal on the internet. In 1994, the journal Classical and Quantum Gravity was published as a TeX file. In January 1996 the organization launched the full electronic journals programme on the World Wide Web, ahead of other physics publishers.

Physics World, the monthly magazine of the Institute of Physics, was first published in October 1988. The title, published by IOP Publishing, won in the App/Digital Edition category for Association/Non-Profit (B-to-B) brands in the Eddie Digital Awards. It also picked up an honourable mention for best Design Cover in the Association/Non-Profit (B-to-B) category in the Ozzie Awards.

Journals
IOPscience is the online service for journal content. Journals include:

 2D Materials
 Advances in Natural Sciences: Nanoscience and Nanotechnology
 Applied Physics Express
 Biofabrication
 Bioinspiration & Biomimetics
 Biomedical Materials
 Biomedical Physics & Engineering Express
 Chinese Physics B
 Chinese Physics C
 Chinese Physics Letters
 Classical and Quantum Gravity
 Communications in Theoretical Physics
 Computational Science & Discovery
 Convergent Science Physical Oncology
 Electronic Structure
 EPL
 Environmental Research Communications
 Environmental Research Letters
 European Journal of Physics
 Flexible and Printed Electronics
 Fluid Dynamics Research
 Functional Composites and Structures
 International Journal of Extreme Manufacturing
 Inverse Problems
 Izvestiya: Mathematics
 Japanese Journal of Applied Physics
 Journal of Breath Research
 Journal of Cosmology and Astroparticle Physics
 Journal of Geophysics and Engineering
 Journal of Instrumentation
 Journal of Micromechanics and Microengineering
 Journal of Neural Engineering
 Journal of Optics
 Journal of Physics A: Mathematical and Theoretical
 Journal of Physics B: Atomic, Molecular and Optical Physics
 Journal of Physics Communications
 Journal of Physics D: Applied Physics
 Journal of Physics G: Nuclear and Particle Physics
 Journal of Physics: Condensed Matter
 Journal of Radiological Protection
 Journal of Semiconductors
 Journal of Statistical Mechanics: Theory and Experiment
 Laser Physics
 Laser Physics Letters
 Machine Learning: Science and Technology
 Materials for Quantum Technology
 Materials Futures
 Materials Research Express
 Measurement Science and Technology
 Methods and Applications in Fluorescence
 Metrologia
 Modelling and Simulation in Materials Science and Engineering
 Multifunctional Materials
 Nano Express
 Nano Futures
 Nanotechnology
 Neuromorphic Computing and Engineering
 New Journal of Physics
 Nonlinearity
 Nuclear Fusion
 Physica Scripta
 Physical Biology
 Physics Education
 Physics in Medicine and Biology
 Physics-Uspekhi
 Physiological Measurement
 Plasma Physics and Controlled Fusion
 Plasma Research Express
 Plasma Science and Technology
 Plasma Sources Science and Technology
 Progress in Biomedical Engineering
 Progress in Energy
 Publications of the Astronomical Society of the Pacific
 Quantum Electronics
 Quantum Science and Technology
 Reports on Progress in Physics
 Research in Astronomy and Astrophysics
 Research Notes of the AAS
 Russian Chemical Reviews
 Russian Mathematical Surveys
 Sbornik: Mathematics
 Semiconductor Science and Technology
 Smart Materials and Structures
 Superconductor Science and Technology
 Surface Topography: Metrology and Properties
 The Astronomical Journal
 The Astrophysical Journal
 The Astrophysical Journal Letters
 The Astrophysical Journal Supplement Series
 The Planetary Science Journal
 Translational Materials Research

Some of these journals are published on behalf of other societies; for example, the Astrophysical Journal group of titles are published in partnership with the American Astronomical Society.

Books
IOP Publishing sold its books publishing division (with the imprint Adam Hilger) to Taylor & Francis in 2005.  As a consequence of recent significant changes in the publishing landscape and demand for ebooks, IOP Publishing launched an ebook programme in 2012. IOP Publishing partnered with Morgan & Claypool on a book programme which is focussed on researchers who are in the early stages of their research careers or who would like to approach a research field more broadly and across disciplines. In 2014 IOP Publishing and the American Astronomical Society announced an electronic book publishing partnership as part of the AAS's mission to enhance and share humanity’s scientific understanding of the universe.

References

External links
 

Institute of Physics
Publishing companies of the United Kingdom
Academic publishing companies